The Exshaw Formation is a stratigraphic unit in the Western Canada Sedimentary Basin. It takes the name from the hamlet of Exshaw, Alberta in the Canadian Rockies, and was first described from outcrops on the banks of Jura Creek north of Exshaw by P.S. Warren in 1937. The formation is of Late Devonian (late Famennian) to Early Mississippian (middle Tournaisian) age as determined by conodont biostratigraphy, and it straddles the Devonian-Carboniferous boundary.

The Exshaw strata were deposited in a marine setting during the Hangenberg event, an oceanic anoxic event associated with the Late Devonian extinction. The black shales of the Exshaw Formation are rich in organic matter and are one of the most important petroleum source rocks of the Western Canada Sedimentary Basin.

Lithology and Environment of Deposition
The Exshaw Formation is informally subdivided into a lower shale member and an upper siltstone and limestone member. The lower shales are dark grey to black, thin-bedded to laminated, and rich in organic matter, with scattered sulphide and phosphate nodules. There is no evidence of disturbance by biological activity. They are believed to have been deposited in an offshore environment on the outer continental shelf under anoxic conditions. The shales are sparsely fossiliferous and contain some conodont elements, ostracods and brachiopod shells.

The upper member consists of brown-weathering, medium- to thick-bedded, calcareous and dolomitic siltstones with subordinate silty limestones. Bioturbation by burrowing marine organisms is common and indicates that they were deposited in an oxygenated environment, closer to the paleocoastline than the lower black shales were.

Thickness and Distribution
It is a widespread unit that can be seen in outcrop at many locations in the Canadian Rockies, and it is present in the subsurface from the prairies of northern Montana to southern Northwest Territories. It is absent at the Peace River Arch, and the upper siltstone member is absent in central Alberta and northern Alberta.

Relationship to other units
Because the Exshaw Formation is a widespread unit, it overlies different formations in different areas. It rests disconformably on the Wabamun Formation in the Alberta plains, the Kotcho Formation in northeastern British Columbia, and the Palliser Formation in the Canadian Rockies and foothills. It is disconformably overlain by the Banff Formation in most areas.

The Exshaw Formation is equivalent to the lower and middle members of the Bakken Formation in southern Alberta, southern Saskatchewan, Montana and North Dakota.

References 

Carboniferous Alberta 
Devonian Alberta
Western Canadian Sedimentary Basin
Mississippian Series
Famennian Stage
Carboniferous System of North America
Devonian System of North America
Devonian southern paleotropical deposits